Sameli Ventelä (born July 19, 1994) is a Finnish professional ice hockey defenceman currently playing for MHk 32 Liptovský Mikuláš of the Slovak Extraliga.

Career
Ventelä began his career with HPK, playing in their various Jr. teams between 2009 and 2015 but did not play for their senior team. He moved onto SaPKo of Mestis on May 26, 2015 and scored 4 goals and 25 assists in 48 games. On April 15, 2016, Ventelä signed for Lukko and played nine games during the 2016–17 Liiga season, scoring no points.

On June 8, 2017, Ventelä joined Ketterä of Mestis and signed a further extension with the team on March 27, 2018. On August 27, 2019, Ventelä signed for HK Dukla Michalovce of Slovakia's Tipsport Liga. In Januari 2021 he was signed for Nybro Vikings IF.

Career statistics

Regular season and playoffs

References

External links

 

1994 births
Living people
Finnish ice hockey defencemen
HK Dukla Michalovce players
Imatran Ketterä players
KeuPa HT players
Lukko players
Nybro Vikings players
People from Hämeenlinna
MHk 32 Liptovský Mikuláš players
SaPKo players
Finnish expatriate ice hockey players in Sweden
Finnish expatriate ice hockey players in Slovakia
Sportspeople from Kanta-Häme